Haga Haga is a village on the Eastern Cape Wild Coast of South Africa, 60 km east of East London.

The village has been declared a conservancy owing to a number of rare indigenous species found in the area, such as the Cape clawless otter and the blue duiker.

References

Populated places in the Great Kei Local Municipality